Glenn Edmund Messer (July 12, 1895 – June 13, 1995) was an American aviation pioneer, responsible for major advances in the use and modification of existing aircraft and in the design and construction of aircraft and aircraft instruments.

Biography
He was born in Henry County, Iowa on July 12, 1895.

He began his flying career by taking lessons on a Wright biplane from aviator George Gustafson in Bay City, Michigan. He and fellow pilot Jack Turner completed a successful demonstration U. S. Air Mail flight from Birmingham's Roberts Field to Marr Field in Chattanooga, Tennessee on March 24, 1925 under a temporary commission. Messer recreated that flight on its 50th anniversary in 1975.

Messer operated Birmingham Municipal Airport in Birmingham, Alabama with Edward Stinson. He later operated Messer Field. In 1927 he started the Southern Aircraft Corporation which designed and built the Air Boss. He later started The Glenn E. Messer Company of Birmingham.

He died on June 13, 1995 in Birmingham, Alabama.

Legacy

The highway from 5th Avenue North in downtown Birmingham to the airport was named the Glenn E. Messer Airport Highway in his honor. In 1991 he was inducted into the Georgia Aviation Hall of Fame.

Timeline
 1911 - takes first flying lessons
 1917 - joins the Aviation Section of Signal Corps
 1919 - flyer on new airmail route from Washington, D.C. to New York, NY
 1920 - starts Messer Flying Circus (Phoebe Fairgrave Omlie soon joins)
 1922 - starts Birmingham Aero Club to sell airplanes
 1925 - organizes company to sell Dim-A-Lite products
 1927 - starts Southern Aircraft Corporation (Messer Aeronautical Industries Inc.)
 1932 - starts The Glenn E. Messer Company
 1965 - The Glenn E. Messer Company, Inc. begins instrument repair operation in Woodlawn
 1976 - forms Southern Museum of Flight Foundation

References

Further reading
 Morehouse, Harold E. (July 1995) "Glenn E. Messer: Pioneer Mid-West Aviator." Early Bird's CHIRP. No. 96
 Wilson, George Tipton. "The Flying Omlies." Aviation History Magazine.

Members of the Early Birds of Aviation
1895 births
1995 deaths
People from Birmingham, Alabama
Aviators from Alabama
People from Henry County, Iowa
Aviators from Iowa